Minnesota rail trails are former railway lines that have been converted to paths designed for pedestrian, bicycle, skating, equestrian, and/or light motorized traffic. Rail trails are multi-use paths offering at least pedestrians and cyclists recreational access to the routes.

Agassiz Recreational Trail  
Big Rivers Regional Trail 
Blue Ox Trail
 Blufflands State Trail: 
 Harmony-Preston segment 
Root River segment 
Bruce Vento Regional Trail 
 Cannon Valley Trail
 Cedar Lake Trail
Central Lakes Trail 
Dakota Rail Regional Trail 
Douglas State Trail 
Gateway State Trail 
Glacial Lakes State Trail 
Goodhue Pioneer State Trail
Hardwood Creek Regional Trail 
Hiawatha LRT Trail
Heartland State Trail 
Lake Wobegon Trails 
Luce Line State Trail 
 Midtown Greenway
Min Hi Line
Paul Bunyan Trail 
Sakatah Singing Hills State Trail 
Soo Line Trail 
Southwest LRT Trail  
Sunrise Prairie Trail 
Wapiti Trail 
 Willard Munger State Trail

See also
 List of rail trails
 List of hiking trails in Minnesota

 
rail trails in Minnesota